Green Lawn Cemetery is a historic private rural cemetery located in Columbus, Ohio, in the United States. Organized in 1848 and opened in 1849, the cemetery was the city's premier burying ground in the 1800s and beyond. An American Civil War memorial was erected there in 1891, and chapel constructed in 1902. With , it is Ohio's second-largest cemetery.

History
Franklinton Cemetery was the first cemetery established in what later became Columbus. It was built on land donated by Lucas Sullivant on River Street near Souder Avenue in 1799. Many of the early settlers of Franklinton and Columbus were buried there. The  North Graveyard followed in 1812, and the  East Graveyard in 1841. A  Roman Catholic cemetery opened in 1848 (although it had been in use as early as 1846).

Establishment of Green Lawn
By the mid-1840s, growing settlement in the area left the Franklinton, North, and East cemeteries too small to accommodate more burials. On February 24, 1848, the Ohio General Assembly enacted a law providing for the incorporation of cemetery associations by 10 or more people. On August 2, 1848, a group of Columbus area business and civic leaders that included A.C Brown, William G. Deshler, William A. Platt, Thomas Sparrow, Alfred P. Stone, Joseph Sullivant, William B. Thrall, and others formed the Green Lawn Cemetery Association. The group secured a charter from the Ohio General Assembly on March 23, 1849, incorporating the "Green Lawn Cemetery of Columbus". A public meeting was held on July 12, and a committee of 11 local leaders appointed to select a site and draft articles of incorporation. The committee presented the public with draft articles of incorporation on August 2. These were accepted, and the first board of directors organized on August 26.

This consisted of a  tract obtained from Judge Gershom M. Peters and a  tract from William Miner. A public picnic was held on the ground on May 23, during which a partial clearing of a small portion of the land occurred. Architect Howard Daniels was hired to lay out the roads, paths, and plots. Daniels had spent several months in Europe studying rural cemetery design there, and had recently designed his first cemetery, Cincinnati's widely praised Spring Grove Cemetery. A formal dedication of the cemetery occurred on July 9. A superintendent's cottage was erected near the main gate on Brown Road, and Richard Woolley appointed the first superintendent. Daniels, who died in December 1863, is buried in the cemetery.

Growth of the cemetery
The first burial at Green Lawn Cemetery was that of a child, Leonora Perry, on July 7, 1849. The second, and first adult, was Dr. B. F. Gard on July 12. The first headstone or other monument in the cemetery was erected the second week of October 1849 by William G. Deshler. It was for his wife, Olive, who had died at the age of 19. The monument consisted of an upright stone slab depicting a rose branch. The bloom itself was carved on the plinth on which the slab stood, and was inscribed "Olive, wife of William G. Deshler, age 19". After Green Lawn opened, most of the families with graves at Franklinton Cemetery moved their ancestral remains to Green Lawn. Franklinton Cemetery quickly fell out of favor as a place to be buried. Those buried at North Graveyard also disinterred loved ones' remains and moved them to Green Lawn. By 1869, about half of those buried at North Graveyard had been reinterred at Green Lawn.

Green Lawn Cemetery lotholders voted to bar non-whites from being buried at Green Lawn in 1856. It was not until 1872 that this restriction was lifted, and a segregated section set aside for African Americans.

In February 1864, the trustees of Green Lawn Cemetery offered to exchange burial lots with those individuals who still retained plots at North Graveyard. Green Lawn intended to build homes on the site of the abandoned North Graveyard and lease them in order to generate income. In addition, the Columbus, Chicago and Indiana Central Railway sought to condemn a portion of the burying ground for a railroad right of way. The two offers generated extensive litigation, as lotholders sought to prevent the disinterment of loved ones and those who had deeded land to the city tried to regain title to it. This litigation was not resolved until the late 1870s, and it was not until 1881 that most graves were removed from North Graveyard.

In 1898, an iron bridge was built over a ravine between sections 54 and 55. By 1919, all the roads in the cemetery were of macadam, and had gutters.

The Soldiers and Sailors' Memorial was erected at Green Lawn Cemetery in 1891. Cemetery officials first set aside a section (M) for military burials on June 10, 1862. The Ex-Soldiers and Sailors' Association of Franklin County, a group of Civil War veterans, purchased four lots in section 28 in November 1881 for the interment of veterans. Two years later, the association began a campaign to raise funds for the design and erection of a veterans memorial in that section. Another four lots in section 28 were purchased in January 1886, and in March 1886 the Ohio General Assembly authorized the commissioners of Franklin County to levy a tax to aid in the construction of the memorial. A memorial design was approved in October 1886, and the memorial erected by the New England Granite Works of Hartford, Connecticut. The $8,900  ($ in  dollars) memorial was completed in November 1890.

21st century vandalism

In 2012, metal thieves damaged numerous family mausoleums, in some cases stealing entire door and window grates and in one case breaking into crypts in a family mausoleum. The perpetrators were never caught, and the cemetery extended fences to prevent after-hours vehicular entry and contract random security patrols.  These measures proved insufficient when the next acts of vandalism occurred.

A vandal struck Green Lawn Cemetery more than a dozen times beginning in the fall of 2014. The vandal initially knocked over gravestones, but over time the damage worsened. By early 2016, more than 600 monuments were damaged as well as glass and the historic bust of Gustavus Swan. Cemetery officials estimated the cost of repairs at more than $1.25 million ($ in  dollars). Cemetery officials contracted full nighttime security patrols in the cemetery and installed numerous security cameras which resulted in identifying the vandal, but he was never charged by law enforcement. By 2021 most of the damage was repaired except for a few broken obelisks.

The enhanced security measures have, as of 2021, curtailed any similar vandalism after-hours.

In the wake of the vandalism, cemetery volunteers and instructors at Columbus State Community College created a geographic information system capstone course. Taught by Doreen Whitley Rogers, nonprofit executive and wife of a cemetery trustee, students in the course donated more than $10,000 ($ in  dollars) in free consulting services to the cemetery. Damaged graves were identified and damage documented, potential vandal points of entry noted, repair cost analyses generated, and patterns of criminal activity in the cemetery identified.

Starting in 2020, a vandal damaged nearly 100 trees over a period of several months during mornings shortly after the grounds opened. , evidence was being processed and charges were pending against an identified suspect.

Huntington Chapel

Green Lawn officials had long desired to build a chapel at the cemetery ever since its formation in 1848. A site was selected, but cemetery expansion made it less than ideal. A second site was selected, but again expansion rendered the site inappropriate. After the 1887 expansion, the board of directors felt secure enough to select a permanent location for the new chapel. Design and construction were put off until enough funds had been raised to erect a substantial building of excellent materials and workmanship. The fundraising effort neared completion in 1899, at which time the board selected architect Frank L. Packard to design the chapel. Packard was a natural choice, as he had advised the board for several years on the landscape design and aesthetics of the cemetery.

This structure, originally called the Mortuary Chapel, was dedicated on November 11, 1902. The chapel is in the  Renaissance Revival style, and features a rotunda capped in red vitrified tile. The dome bears a resemblance to the Ohio Statehouse (then still under construction). The foundations are of concrete and stone, and arches of brick and concrete support the building above. The exterior walls are of white marble, while the interior walls are clad in "English vein" Italian marble. The main entry doors are bronze and flanked by Ionic columns, while the interior floor is a geometric pattern of black and white tile. The dome, made of leaded art glass, supported by interior pilasters of bronze and marble.

The chapel contains two murals (depicting Truth and Wisdom), a number of mosaics, and windows of both leaded and stained glass. The art glass murals were designed by Frederick Wilson and executed by Tiffany & Co. The stained glass windows were designed by Tiffany & Co. The north window depicts Peggy Thompson, the first white woman known to die in the area, and the south window Isaac Dalton, a superintendent of the Soldier's Home in Columbus who took special care of wounded soldiers during the American Civil War. Peletiah Huntington, founder of what became Huntington Bancshares, donated the mosaics, murals, and stained glass windows. The rest of the chapel cost $24,000 ($ in  dollars). The funeral space in the chapel was dedicated to Huntington in 1902 with the placement of a bronze tablet there.

The Mortuary Chapel was designed to be a place where funerals could be held. Over time, few funerals were held there. Instead, the public began using the chapel as a meditative space, and requesting to be buried inside it. The chapel was renovated, a west wing with service room and bathrooms added, and a carillon with bells constructed in 1963. The leaded glass rotunda was capped with a concrete dome to protect it. The addition and carillon were in the Neoclassical style. A north wing was completed in 1979. The Thompson stained glass window was removed, and a door cut through to the new wing. The historic window was relocated to the east wall of the new wing, while a new stained glass window and fountain were placed at the west wall of the wing. The north wing serves as an indoor mausoleum.

The chapel was rededicated in the early 2000s as Huntington Chapel.

About Green Lawn Cemetery

Green Lawn Cemetery is privately owned by the nonprofit Green Lawn Cemetery Association. The cemetery is one of Ohio's most prominent rural (or "garden") cemeteries. Any member of the public may purchase a plot.

As of 2021, Green Lawn Cemetery contained , making it Ohio's second-largest cemetery. About  were undeveloped, which cemetery officials said should provide burial space for another 100 to 150 years. About  of roads wind through the burying ground.

There are roughly 7,000 trees belonging to 150 species at the cemetery. This includes four "state champion" trees (the largest and tallest trees of their species anywhere in the state). In 1999, the Audubon Society recognized Green Lawn Cemetery as part of the Lower Scioto River Ohio "Important Bird Area".

According to cemetery records in 2021, more than 155,000 people were buried at Green Lawn Cemetery. This included 6,000 veterans buried in seven military sections (thousands more are buried on private lots), of which 15 were generals and five Medal of Honor recipients. Portions of two of the military sections are National Cemeteries.

Sections at Green Lawn Cemetery were originally lettered in the order in which they were developed. The cemetery's rapid expansion forced the cemetery to begin numbering sections after running through the alphabet.

Notable structures and art
The Hayden family mausoleum is the cemetery's largest. Designed by local architect Frank L. Packard, it was completed for banker Charles H. Hayden in early 1905. Built at a cost of about $80,000 to $100,000 ($ to $ in  dollars), the Neoclassical style tomb had a granite foundation, interior and exterior walls of white Vermont marble, and two Ionic columns on each side of the main entrance. The interior is octagonal, and features two columns of marble with a hue like alabaster in each corner. The tomb originally contained eight marble sarcophagi, carved in Italy. The main doors were of bronze. Hayden wanted the construction of the mausoleum to be a surprise for his family, so Packard refused to tell the press or cemetery officials who commissioned the work until it was completed.

A row of small, Egyptian Revival mausoleums in section 65 contains the Packard mausoleum. Architect Frank L. Packard designed the Packard family mausoleum himself.

Notable burials

Notable individuals buried at the cemetery include:

 De Witt C. Badger, member of the U.S. House of Representatives and Mayor of Columbus
 Gordon Battelle, founder of Battelle Memorial Institute
Otto Beatty Jr., attorney, politician, Civil Rights leader
 Thomas Blakiston, English explorer and naturalist
 John W. Bricker, Ohio Governor, U.S. Senator, and U.S. Vice Presidential candidate
 Samuel Bush, industrialist, grandfather of President George H. W. Bush, and great-grandfather of President George W. Bush
 James E. Campbell, Governor of Ohio and member of the U.S. House of Representatives
 William Turner Coggeshall, newspaper editor, spy for the Union Army, U.S. Ambassador to Ecuador
 James M. Comly, Civil War general in the Union Army, newspaper editor, and political backer
 James L. Conger, member of the U.S. House of Representatives
 George L. Converse, member of the U.S. House of Representatives
 Howard Daniels, landscape architect and rural cemetery designer
 Augustus Stoner Decker, Mayor of Columbus
 William Dennison Jr., Governor of Ohio
 Cromwell Dixon, aviation pioneer, first person to fly over the Continental Divide
 Daniel S. Earhart, member of the U.S. House of Representatives
 Merie Earle, actress
 Al G. Field, minstrel show operator
 James W. Forsyth, U.S. Army general, war criminal 
 Samuel Galloway, member of the U.S. House of Representatives 
 Wally Gerber, baseball player
 Washington Gladden, minister and social reformer
 Lincoln Goodale, first physician to practice in Columbus
 Stomp Gordon, jump blues pianist and singer
 Clinton Greaves, Buffalo Soldier and Medal of Honor recipient
 Phale Hale, civil rights leader and Ohio state legislator
 Henry Howe, historian
 Alfred Kelley, banker, canal builder, and railroad executive
 Nathan Kelley, architect, designer of the Ohio Statehouse
 Simon Lazarus, founder of Lazarus department stores
 John J. Lentz, member of the U.S. House of Representatives 
 George H. Maetzel, Ohio architect
 William T. Martin, Mayor of Columbus
 Edward S. Matthias, longest-serving associate justice on the Supreme Court of Ohio
 Abram Irvin McDowell, Mayor of Columbus
 William L. McMillen, physician, Civil War general in the Union Army, and carpetbagger legislator
 Samuel Medary, newspaper owner and territorial governor of Minnesota and Kansas
 Grant Mitchell, actor
 John G. Mitchell, Civil War general in the Union Army
 Heman A. Moore, member of the U.S. House of Representatives 
 George K. Nash, Governor of Ohio
 Edward Orton Sr., Ohio State Geologist and first president of Ohio State University
 Edward Orton Jr., Ohio State Geologist and ceramic engineer
 Joseph H. Outhwaite, member of the U.S. House of Representatives 
 Frank Packard, architect
 Alice E. Heckler Peters (1845-1921), social reformer
 Frederick Phisterer, Civil War captain and recipient of the Medal of Honor
James Preston Poindexter, abolitionist, Civil Rights activist
 Joseph H. Potter, American Civil War general in the Union Army
 James A. Rhodes, Governor of Ohio and Mayor of Columbus
 Eddie Rickenbacker, WWI flying ace and industrialist
 Joseph Ridgway, member of the U.S. House of Representatives 
 James Linn Rodgers, American diplomat
 Alice Schille, watercolor artist
 Orland Smith, Civil War general in the Union Army
 James H. Snook, Ohio State University professor and convicted murderer
 Billy Southworth, baseball player and manager, inducted to the National Baseball Hall of Fame in 2008
 Billy Southworth Jr., baseball player and bomber pilot, son of Billy Southworth
 Alfred P. Stone, member of the U.S. House of Representatives  
 Lucas Sullivant, land surveyor, founder of Franklinton, Ohio
 Joseph Rockwell Swan, associate justice of the Supreme Court of Ohio
 Edward L. Taylor Jr., member of the U.S. House of Representatives 
 William Oxley Thompson, fifth President of Ohio State University
 James Thurber, humorist, author, and New Yorker columnist
 Allen G. Thurman, member of the U.S. Senate and U.S. House of Representatives, associate justice of the Supreme Court of Ohio, and U.S. Vice Presidential candidate  
 Dan Tipton, sailor, gambler, and posse rider with Wyatt Earp's vendetta ride
 Edward C. Turner, Ohio Attorney General and associate justice of the Supreme Court of Ohio
 John Martin Vorys, member of the U.S. House of Representatives  
 Charles C. Walcutt, Civil War general  in the Union Army and Mayor of Columbus
 David K. Watson, member of the U.S. House of Representatives
 Wallace Ralston Westlake, Mayor of Columbus
 Wayne Bidwell Wheeler, Prohibitionist and leader of Anti-Saloon League
James Andrew Williams, Major League Baseball manager
 William Tecumseh Wilson, Civil War general in the Union Army
 George Ziegler, Civil War general in the Union Army

See also
 Green Lawn Abbey, nearby but unrelated

References
Notes

Citations

Bibliography

External links

Green Lawn Cemetery burial search and plat maps provided by Central Ohio Gravesearch
Green Lawn Cemetery burial search and grave images provided by Franklin County, Ohio Gravestone Photos Etc. at GenealogyBug.net

Geography of Columbus, Ohio
Tourist attractions in Columbus, Ohio
1849 establishments in Ohio
Cemeteries in Columbus, Ohio
Rural cemeteries